Eilean Munde is a small uninhabited island in Loch Leven, close to Ballachulish.

It is the site of a chapel built by St. Fintan Mundus (also known as Saint Fintan Munnu), who travelled here from Iona in the 7th century. The church was burnt in 1495 and rebuilt in the 16th century. The last service in the church was held in July, 1653.

The island is the site of a graveyard once used by the Stewarts of Ballachulish, the MacDonalds of Glencoe and the Camerons of Callart. The clans shared the island and the maintenance of the graveyard, even when there was conflict between them. The last burial took place in 1972, of Mrs Christina MacDonald Sharpe, a native of Glencoe.

Eilean a' Chomhraidh
Near Eilean Munde (or Mhunna) is a smaller island, Eilean a' Chomhraidh (Eilean na Comhairle) or the Isle of Discussion. This was the meeting-place of those persons who had disputes with their neighbours on the land question, and perhaps on other matters besides. When their disputes had been settled satisfactorily the erstwhile disputants sailed up the loch to Eilean na Bainne (about one-and-a-quarter miles west of Kinlochleven). This is the Isle of Covenant or Ratification; here the agreements were drawn up and sealed. Eilean na Bainne is spelled Ylen na Ban in Timothy Pont's map of the area.

Visit by Robert Forbes

On July 6, 1770, Bishop Robert Forbes sailed up Loch Leven. He records: 

In a letter to Mr. Stewart of Ballachulish, dated Leith, Nov. 15, 1770, after giving the history of the saint, as in the text, he proceeds:

References

Uninhabited islands of Highland (council area)
Clan Donald
Lochaber
Glen Coe